"The Outsider" is a short story by American horror writer H. P. Lovecraft. Written between March and August 1921, it was first published in Weird Tales, April 1926. In this work, a mysterious individual who has been living alone in a castle for as long as he can remember decides to break free in search of human contact and light. "The Outsider" is one of Lovecraft's most commonly reprinted works and is also one of the most popular stories ever to be published in Weird Tales.

"The Outsider" combines horror, fantasy, and gothic fiction to create a nightmarish story, containing themes of loneliness, the abhuman, and the afterlife. Its epigraph is from John Keats' 1819 poem "The Eve of St. Agnes".

Inspiration

In a letter, Lovecraft himself said that, of all his tales, this story most closely resembles the style of his idol Edgar Allan Poe, writing that it "represents my literal though unconscious imitation of Poe at its very height." The opening paragraphs echo those of Poe's "Berenice", while the horror at the party recalls the unmasking scene in "The Masque of the Red Death".

The story may also have been inspired in part by Nathaniel Hawthorne's "Fragments from the Journal of a Solitary Man", in which a man dreams that he is walking down Broadway in a burial shroud, only understanding the shocked reaction of passersby when he sees his reflection in a shop window.

Another suggested literary model is Mary Shelley's novel Frankenstein (1818), in which the creature causes a shock when he enters a cottage: "I had hardly placed my foot within the door before the children shrieked, and one of the women fainted." The monster later looks in a pool of water and sees his reflection for the first time.

Colin Wilson, in The Strength to Dream (1961), points to Oscar Wilde's short story "The Birthday of the Infanta", in which a misshapen dwarf is horrified to see his reflection for the first time.

Some critics have suggested that "The Outsider" is autobiographical, and that Lovecraft was talking about his own life when he wrote, "I know always that I am an outsider; a stranger in this century and among those who are still men." An H. P. Lovecraft Encyclopedia finds this analysis to be exaggerated, but suggests that the story "may possibly be indicative of HPL's own self-image, particularly the image of one who always thought himself ugly and whose mother told at least one individual about her son's 'hideous' face."

Synopsis

"The Outsider" is written in a first-person narrative style, and details the miserable and apparently lonely life of an individual, who appears to have never made contact with another person. The story begins, with the narrator explaining his origins. His memory of others is vague, and he cannot seem to recall any details of his personal history, including who he is or where he is originally from. The narrator tells of his environment: a dark, decaying castle amid an "endless forest" of high trees that block out the light from the sun. He has never seen natural light, nor another human being, and he has never ventured from the prison-like home he now inhabits. The only knowledge the narrator has of the outside world is from his reading of the "antique books" that line the walls of his castle.

The narrator tells of his eventual determination to free himself, from what he views as an existence within a prison. He decides to climb the ruined staircase of the high castle tower which seems to be his only hope to see the sky. At the place where the stairs terminate into crumbled ruins, the narrator begins a long, slow climb up the tower wall, until he eventually finds a trapdoor in the ceiling, which he pushes up and climbs through. Amazingly, he finds himself not at the great height he anticipated, but at ground level in another world. With the sight of the full moon before him, he proclaims, "There came to me the purest ecstasy I have ever known." Overcome with the emotion he feels in beholding what—until now—he had only read about, the narrator takes in his new surroundings. He realizes that he is in an old churchyard, and he wanders out into the countryside before eventually coming upon another castle.

Upon visiting the castle, which he finds "maddeningly familiar", the narrator sees a gathering of people at a party within. Longing for some type of human contact, he climbs through a window into the room. Upon his entering, the people inside become terrified. They scream and collectively flee from the room, many stumbling blindly with their hands held over their eyes toward the walls in search of an exit. As the narrator stands alone in the room, with the screams of the party vanishing into far away echoes, he becomes frightened at what must be lurking near him. He walks around the room searching for what might be hidden in the shadows but finds nothing. As he moves towards one of the room's alcoves, he detects a presence and approaches it slowly.

In his shock and surprise, he loses his balance and touches the creature. Horrified, he runs from the building back to his castle, where he tries unsuccessfully to crawl back through the grate into his old world. Cast out of his old existence, the narrator now rides with the "mocking and friendly ghouls on the night wind", forever and officially an outsider, since the moment he stretched his fingers towards the creature's paw in the alcove, and felt nothing but the "cold and unyielding surface of polished glass" of a mirror.

Analysis

Horror historian Les Daniels described "The Outsider" as "arguably the author's finest work". Joanna Russ praised "The Outsider" as one of Lovecraft's best stories, describing it as "poetically melancholy". Though some may contend that Lovecraft's "The Outsider" is purely a horror story, there are predominantly Gothic themes that play significant roles in this short story including loneliness, the abhuman, and the afterlife that take it to a more psychological level.

Loneliness

The narrator in "The Outsider" exists in a perpetual state of loneliness. At the onset of the story, it is revealed that he has lived for years in the castle but cannot recall any person ever being there except for himself. Neither can he recall the presence of anything alive but the "noiseless rats and bats and spiders" that surround him. He has never heard the voice of another human being, nor has he ever spoken aloud. His only encounters with the outside world are those he attains from reading the old books that have been left within the castle.

Upon encountering humanity later in the story, the narrator is left even more lonely than before. He has come to witness human life and has been immediately shunned from it due to his appearance. Being outcast from the society he longed to know forced the narrator to continue living life as a recluse. However, this time it has been made worse because what he has lost was no longer a vague idea from a book but a tangible thing held out of his grasp. He is the monster.

The ab-human

In Gothic fiction, ab-human refers to a "Gothic body" or something that is only vestigially human and possibly in the process of becoming something monstrous, such as a vampire, werewolf, or in this case a walking corpse.  Kelly Hurley writes that the "abhuman subject is a not-quite-human subject, characterized by its morphic variability, continually in danger of becoming not-itself, becoming other."

The idea of "becoming other" parallels what is happening in this story. The intensity of the process is heightened because the reader is learning of this transition from human to the ab-human right along with the narrator who is learning it himself.

Connections to other Lovecraft stories

Ghouls make frequent appearances in Lovecraft's work, such as in The Dream-Quest of Unknown Kadath (1926), although they are generally very different from the undead creatures described here. This story also mentions Nitocris and Nephren-Ka briefly. Nitocris, a legendary queen of Egypt, also makes an appearance in the 1924 Lovecraft and Harry Houdini collaboration "Imprisoned with the Pharaohs". Nephren-Ka is mentioned in "The Haunter of the Dark" as the Pharaoh who built "a temple with a windowless crypt" to the Shining Trapezohedron, and "did that which caused his name to be stricken from all monuments and records".

Adaptations

In 1964, Erik Bauersfeld narrated an audio adaptation on the old-time radio program The Black Mass. This adaptation was later used as part of a limited edition LP release along with his audio adaptation of the Lovecraft story "The Rats in the Walls".
Roddy McDowall was the narrator of the story on a 1966 LP release (Lively Arts 30003) that also included the Lovecraft story "The Hound".
The 1995 Stuart Gordon film Castle Freak is based upon this story and "The Rats in the Walls". A reboot/remake of the 1995 film was released in 2020.
In 2019, a modern-day adaptation of the short story, directed by Ludvig Gür, premiered at the H.P. Lovecraft Film Festival. It played at multiple festivals and was picked up by horror-brand ALTER (a division of Gunpowder & Sky) for online distribution and was featured in the H.P. Lovecraft Film Festival Best of 2019 DVD Collection.
Season 4 of the Netflix series Chilling Adventures of Sabrina features various Lovecraft entities as antagonists. In episode 2, "The Uninvited", the Outsider is portrayed as a hideously filthy vagrant who asks for shelter, but murders anyone who does not invite him in.

Notes

References
 Definitive version.

External links

 
 
 

1926 short stories
Ancient Egypt in fiction
Fantasy short stories
Horror short stories
Short stories by H. P. Lovecraft
Works originally published in Weird Tales
Short stories adapted into films